Hellinsia didactylites is a moth of the family Pterophoridae. It is found in most of Europe (except the Iceland, Ireland, Great Britain, the Iberian Peninsula and most of the Balkan Peninsula), east into Russia.

The larvae feed on various Hieracium species including: Hieracium umbellatum, Hieracium prenanthoides, Hieracium amplexicaule, Hieracium murorum, Hieracium lachenalii and Hieracium sylvaticum.

References

External links
 Swedish Moths

didactylites
Moths described in 1783
Plume moths of Europe
Taxa named by Hans Strøm